Millie Donay (born Carmela Dante Di Stefano; February 23, 1934 – July 16, 2007) was an American professional Latin dancer, a pioneer of Mambo dance.

Her first partner (1950–1956) was Pedro "Cuban Pete" Aguilar of the Palladium Ballroom. Among many other places, they performed at Carnegie Hall, the Apollo Theater, Waldorf Astoria, and in Madison Square Garden for Israeli President David Ben-Gurion. They trained the teachers of the Arthur Murray Dance Studios in Latin dances.

During 1957–1960, she and Marilyn Winters formed a Latin dance team.

Filmography
Mambo Madness, featured with Cuban Pete.
Mambo Kings, featured and co-choreographed with Cuban Pete.

References

American female dancers
1934 births
2007 deaths
20th-century American dancers
20th-century American women
21st-century American women